Plataforma per Catalunya (PxC) was a far-right political party rooted in Catalonia, Spain, which centred its political agenda around controlling immigration and was opposed to Catalan independence. It was strongly anti-Islamic, and was widely considered a racist, xenophobic far-right political force. Its leader was Josep Anglada, town councillor in Vic.

PxC had 8 local representatives, often in cities with tensions between locals and immigrants. They have not had any representatives at provincial, regional or national level. In 2014, the faction of PxC supporting Catalan independence splintered to form a new far-right pro-independence party "Som Catalans" (We are Catalans). PxC merged with the Spanish nationalist party VOX in February 2019.

Ideology
In 2011 the PxC were investigated after ordering a "Night of the Long Knives" against Muslim clerics in Catalonia.

The PxC councillor in Salt, Girona, voted against criminalising homophobia in the city in 2013.

The PxC took a stance against the enquiry for the political future of Catalonia of 2014, also known as 9-N, which the party considered an illegal attempt of secession of the autonomous community with respect to the rest of Spain.

International relations 
At their 2008 Congress, the PxC invited the Vlaams Belang of Belgium and the Lega Nord of Italy to attend. In 2012, a senior PxC member congratulated the Golden Dawn of Greece on their general election results.

History
 
Anglada started the party on 15 January 2001 as the Plataforma Vigatana (Platform for Vic). The PxC entered their first municipal elections in 2003, winning one seat in five respective cities. Cervera in Lleida province gave the largest percentage to the party, at 9.2%.

In the 2010 Catalan parliamentary election they received 2.4% of votes, falling 15,000 votes short of entering Parliament.

In the 2011 local elections, PxC got 65,905 votes, and grew from 17 to 67 councillors. Two were elected in Hospitalet de Llobregat, Catalonia's second-largest city. Three were elected in Santa Coloma de Gramenet, which along with the two in Hospitalet constitute the PxC's first representation in Greater Barcelona. Mataró, in Barcelona province, had the highest percentage voting for the party (10.49%, 3 seats). In Vic, the PxC grew from four to five councillors, making them the city's second-largest party after Convergence and Union.

In 2014, the members of the party supportive of the Catalan independence movement left to found their own political party: Som Catalans ("We are Catalans").

On 16 February 2019, the PxC was absorbed into Vox.

Attempts at national expansion
Parties affiliated with the PxC were set up in other regions of Spain, however they have not obtained any electoral success. The Platform for Madrid (PxM) cut off its links to Anglada's party in March 2006.

In 2012, Anglada announced the launch of the Plataforma por la Libertad (PxL), an expansion of the party into the rest of Spain. Anglada and the PxL have protested against the construction of mosques in Spain. Plataforma por la Libertad was refounded in 2013 as the Party for Freedom.

Electoral performance

Parliament of Catalonia

References

External links 

 

Far-right political parties in Spain
Political parties in Catalonia
Right-wing populism in Spain
Anti-Islam political parties in Europe
2002 establishments in Spain
Anti-Islam sentiment in Spain
Spanish nationalism
Political parties established in 2002
Political parties disestablished in 2019
Far-right politics in Catalonia